The Devil in the White City: Murder, Magic, and Madness at the Fair That Changed America is a 2003 historical non-fiction book by Erik Larson presented in a novelistic style. Set in Chicago during the 1893 World's Columbian Exposition, it tells the story of World’s Fair architect Daniel Burnham and of H. H. Holmes, a criminal figure widely considered the first serial killer in the United States.

Leonardo DiCaprio purchased the film rights in 2010. The concept has since been in development hell; in March 2023, Hulu announced they would no longer be pursuing a television series using the rights.

Plot 

The Devil in the White City is divided into four parts, the first three happening in Chicago between 1890 and 1893, while part four of the book takes place in Philadelphia circa 1895. The book interweaves the true tales of Daniel Burnham, the architect behind the 1893 World's Fair, and H. H. Holmes, a serial killer who lured his victims to their deaths in his elaborately constructed "Murder Castle".

Reception 
Janet Maslin of the New York Times praised the book as “vivid” and “lively”, and commented on how the research done by Larson on the many ”odd and amazing” events of the 1893 exhibition are “given shape and energy” by his “dramatic inclinations”.

David Traxel for the New York Times criticized Larson for having “little sense of pacing or focus” in the “grab-bag” approach he took when discussing the exhibition. Regarding the discussion of Holmes in the book, he writes that Larson’s “imaginative touches…sometimes goes farther than the sources warrant”.

Adaptation 
Leonardo DiCaprio purchased the film rights to the book in 2010. The film version, as originally planned, would have been directed by Martin Scorsese, written by Billy Ray, and produced jointly by Paramount Pictures, Double Feature Films, and DiCaprio's Appian Way Productions.

In 2019, Hulu began developing a series based on the book. Leonardo DiCaprio and Martin Scorsese were signed on to executive produce. It was announced in January 2022 that actor Keanu Reeves was in negotiations to star in the series and Todd Field would direct the first two episodes. Production and filming were expected to begin March 2023 in Chicago and Toronto, with the series expected to launch in 2024. In October 2022, Reeves left the production without comment. Field left the project a couple of days later. In March 2023, it was reported that Hulu would not move forward with the series.

Honors 
 2003 New York Times best seller (Nonfiction)
 2003 International Horror Guild Award (Nonfiction)
 2003 San Francisco Chronicle Best Book of the Year
 2003 National Book Award (Nonfiction), finalist
 2003 CWA Gold Dagger for Non-Fiction, shortlist
 2003 Great Lakes Book Award (Nonfiction), finalist
 2004 Washington State Book Award
 2004 Pacific Northwest Booksellers Association Award
 2004 Edgar Award (Best Fact Crime), winner
 2004 Book Sense Book of the Year Honor Book, winner
 2009 ALA Outstanding Books for the College Bound (History & Cultures)

References

External links 
 Official Random House page for the book
Presentation by Larson on The Devil in the White City, February 18, 2003, C-SPAN
Booknotes interview with Larson on The Devil in the White City, September 14, 2003, C-SPAN
Book group discussion on The Devil in the White City, October 13, 2005, C-SPAN

2003 non-fiction books
Architecture books
History of Chicago
Non-fiction books about serial killers
World's Columbian Exposition
Books about Chicago